Anselm Maria Fürst Fugger von Babenhausen (1 July 1766 – 20 November 1821) was a German nobleman of the Fugger family. He was the first reigning Count (and later Imperial Prince) of the Principality of Babenhausen, in what is now 
the Landkreis Unterallgäu.

Life

Early life
Anselm Maria Joseph Christoph Johann Baptist Johann Nepomuk Rupert Theodor Aloys Karl Prince Fugger von Babenhausen was the eldest son of count Anselm Viktorian Fugger and his wife Maria Walburga, born countess of Waldburg-Wolfegg-Wolfegg. This made Anselm a direct male-line descendant of Anton Fugger's son Jakob (1542–1598).

After an apprenticeship with a court master, cavalier journeys and studies in Mainz, from 1785 Fugger began to focus his future duties as sovereign in Babenhausen. After the death of his father in 1793 he took over the affairs of state. Since 1583 the Fuggers had held the hereditary imperial and district estates in the Swabian district and belonged to the Swabian Imperial Counts' College.

From 1796 Fugger's actions were influenced by the beginning of the Napoleonic era, as there was a strong Austrian decline in power in Swabia. French armies began to devastate Swabia. In 1800 Babenhausen was occupied by French troops for the first time.

Elevation to Imperial Prince
Around 1800 there was an imbalance in the Council of Princes in favour of the Protestant princes. The imperial court had the ambition to change this. Thus it let it be circulated that under certain circumstances it could raise catholic states of the empire into the imperial princely state. However, this increase was not to be free of charge. Given Anselm Maria's desolate financial circumstances, the sum of 20000 gulden demanded was horrendous. Nevertheless, it was important for Anselm Maria to seize the opportunity.

After the Peace of Lunéville in 1801 and the subsequent main decision of the Reichsdeputation in 1803, Fugger's efforts consisted in securing the future of his present principality through as many activities as possible. Through activities in the Swabian district and in the Swabian Imperial Count's College he tried to do this with like-minded people. In the 3rd Coalition War in autumn 1805, he and his colleagues tried in vain to preserve independence and reduce the burden of war. 

With the conclusion of the Rhenish Federal Act of 12 July 1806 and the associated end of the Empire, the end of the smaller states and thus also of the Principality of Babenhausen was sealed. On 15 September 1806 the Kingdom of Bavaria formally took possession of the Principality of Babenhausen. In 1806 and 1807 Anselm Maria attempted to improve the lot of his principality and his dominions under the Bavarian crown. He was only granted the same rights as the other formerly smaller secular imperial estates occupied by Bavaria, the Mediatized. In 1808 he received the court office of a Bavarian crown chamberlain.

Materialien zu Germaniens Wiedergeburt and its results

Nobleman

Family tree

1766 births
1821 deaths
Counts of Germany
Members of the Bavarian Reichsrat
Anselm